Arsenijević is a Serbian surname, a patronymic derived from the given name Arsenije (from Greek Arsenios). It may refer to:

Milorad Arsenijević (d. 1987), Yugoslav Serbian footballer
Filip Arsenijević, Serbian footballer
Stefan Arsenijević (born 1977), Serbian film director
Nemanja Arsenijević (born 1986), Serbian footballer
Vladimir Arsenijević (born 1965), Serbian novelist
Marina Arsenijevic (born 1970), Serbian-born American concert pianist and composer

See also
Arsenović
Arsić

Serbian surnames
Patronymic surnames
Surnames from given names